Haji Khel is a town located at  at 2,117 m altitude in the northern part of Ab Band district, Ghazni Province, Afghanistan and is the capital of the district.

Climate
Haji Khel features a humid continental climate with mediterranean precipitation patterns (Köppen: Dsa). It has hot, dry summers and cold, snowy winters.

See also
 Ghazni Province

References

Populated places in Ghazni Province